Dr James Murray FRSE (21 July 1865, Glasgow – February 1914) was a biologist and explorer.

Early life and education

He was born at 50 Charlotte Street in Glasgow the son of William Murray, a grocer, and his wife, Janet McMurray. He studied Zoology at Glasgow University and took art classes at Glasgow School of Art.

Career
In 1902, he assisted the oceanographer Sir John Murray with a bathymetric survey of Scottish freshwater lochs.  Murray undertook both biological and bathymetric surveys. In particular, he contributed to tardigrade and bdelloid rotifer science: describing 113 species and forma of rotifer and 66 species of tardigrade.

In July 1907, he was elected a Fellow of the Royal Society of Edinburgh. His proposers were Sir John Murray, George Chrystal, James Burgess and Thomas Nicol Johnston. He was awarded the Society's Neil Prize for the period 1909-11.

In 1907, at the age of 41, he served under Ernest Shackleton on the Nimrod Expedition where he was in charge of the base camp. In 1913, he co-wrote a book about the expedition, titled Antarctic Days, with George Edward Marston (1882–1940), a fellow member of the expedition.

In 1911, aged 46, he joined with the explorer Percy Fawcett, Henry Costin and Henry Manley to explore and chart the jungle in the region of the Peru-Bolivian border. Murray, unused to the rigours of the tropical regions, fared poorly. Eventually Fawcett diverted the expedition to get Murray out, such was his condition. He briefly dropped out of sight, having been recovering in a house in Tambopata. He reached La Paz in 1912, learning that he was thought to have died.

Murray, angry at perceived mistreatment at Fawcett's hands, wanted to sue. However friends at the Royal Geographical Society advised him against it.

Final expedition and disappearance
In June 1913, he joined a Canadian scientific expedition to the Arctic aboard the ill-fated Karluk as oceanographer. The ship became trapped in the Arctic ice in August 1913. Eventually, Murray and three others, dissatisfied with Captain Robert Bartlett's leadership, decided to try to reach safety on their own, and, after signing a letter absolving the captain of responsibility and after receiving supplies from him, they departed across the ice on February 5 to try to reach Wrangel Island or Herald Island. They were last seen experiencing major difficulties a few days later by three people returning from another mission (ship's steward Ernest Chafe, and two Inuit, Kataktovik and Kuraluk), but they refused to return to the ship. The only subsequent hint of their fate was a sailor's scarf belonging to one of them (seaman Stanley Morris), later found buried in an ice floe.

Murray and his three companions are presumed to have died in the Arctic in February 1914.

Personal life
In 1892, he married Mary Lyall.

In popular culture

Film
Murray was portrayed by Angus Macfadyen in the 2016 film The Lost City of Z.

Works
Murray, J., 1905. The Tardigrada of the Scottish Lochs. Trans. R. Soc. Edinb., 41: 677 - 698
Murray, J., 1905. Microscopic life of St. Kilda. Ann. Scott. Nat. Hist., 54: 94 - 96
Murray, J., 1905. The Tardigrada of the Forth Valley. Ann. Scott. Nat. Hist., 55: 160 - 164
Murray, J., 1906. The Tardigrada of the Forth Valley. Part II. Ann. Scott. Nat. Hist., 60: 214 - 217
Murray, J., 1906. Scottish National Antarctic Expedition: Tardigrada of the South Orkneys. Trans. Roy. Soc. Edinb., 45: 323 - 339
Murray, J., 1906. Scottish Alpine Tardigrada. Ann. Scott. Nat. Hist., 57: 25 - 30
Murray, J., 1906. Scottish Alpine Tardigrada. Ann. Scott. Nat. Hist., 60: 214 - 217
Murray, J., 1907. Water-bears or Tardigrada. Quekett Micr. Club, 10: 55 - 70
Murray, J., 1907. Arctic Tardigrada, collected by Wm. S. Bruce. Transactions of the Royal Society of Edinburgh, 45: 669 - 681
Murray, J., 1907. Some Tardigrada of the Sikkim Himalaya. J. Roy. Microsc. Soc., 1907: 269 - 273
Murray, J., 1907. Encystment of Tardigrada. Trans. R. Soc. Edinb., 45: 837 - 854
Murray, J., 1907. Some South African Tardigrada. J. R. Micr. Soc. London, 5: 515 - 524
Murray, J., 1907. Some Tardigrada from the Sikkim Himalaya, Journ. R. Micr. Soc., pt. 3: 269 - 273, pl. 14
Murray, J., 1907. The encystment of Macrobiotus. The Zoologist, 11: 4 - 11
Murray, J., 1907. Scottish Tardigrada collected by the Lake Survey. Trans. Roy. Soc. Edinburgh, 45: 641 - 668
Murray, J., 1910. Tardigrada. British Antarctic Expedition 1907 - 1909. Reports on the Scientific Investigations. Vol. 1 Biology (Part V): 83 - 187 (plates 14 - 21)
Murray, J., 1910. Canadian Tardigrada. In Report for the Scientific Investigation of the British Antarctic Expedition 1907 - 1909. Volume I. London: 158 - 178
Murray, J., 1911. Water-bears or Tardigrada. J. Quekett Micr. Club., 11: 181 - 198
Murray, J., 1911. Arctiscoida. Proc. R. Ir. Acad., 31: 1 - 16
Murray, J., 1911. Scottish Tardigrada, a review of our present knowledge. Ann. Scott. Nat. Hist., 78: 88 - 95
Murray, J., 1911. Clare Island Survey: Arctiscoidea. Proc. Roy. Irish Acad., Dublin, 31: 1 - 16
Murray, J., 1913. African Tardigrada. J. R. Micr. Soc. London, pt. 2: 136 - 144
Murray, J., 1913. Notes on the Natural History of Bolivia and Peru. Scottish Oceanogr. Lab., Edinburgh: 1 - 45 (Tardigrada, pp. 28 – 30)

References

Further reading
Niven, Jennifer (2001). The Ice Master. London: Pan Books. .

Shackleton, Heart of the Antarctic.

1865 births
1914 deaths
British polar explorers
20th-century explorers
Scottish explorers
Fellows of the Royal Society of Edinburgh
Year of death uncertain
Shipwreck survivors